The 1880 New Hampshire gubernatorial election was held on November 2, 1880. Republican nominee Charles H. Bell defeated Democratic nominee Frank Jones with 51.57% of the vote.

General election

Candidates
Major party candidates
Charles H. Bell, Republican
Frank Jones, Democratic

Other candidates
Warren G. Brown, Greenback
George D. Dodge, Prohibition

Results

References

1880
New Hampshire
Gubernatorial